SHRDLU was an early natural-language understanding computer program, developed by Terry Winograd at MIT in 1968–1970. In the program, the user carries on a conversation with the computer, moving objects, naming collections and querying the state of a simplified "blocks world", essentially a virtual box filled with different blocks.

SHRDLU was written in the Micro Planner and Lisp programming language on the DEC PDP-6 computer and a DEC graphics terminal. Later additions were made at the computer graphics labs at the University of Utah, adding a full 3D rendering of SHRDLU's "world".

The name SHRDLU was derived from ETAOIN SHRDLU, the arrangement of the letter keys on a Linotype machine, arranged in descending order of usage frequency in English.

Functionality
SHRDLU was primarily a language parser that allowed user interaction using English terms. The user instructed SHRDLU to move various objects around in the "blocks world" containing various basic objects: blocks, cones, balls, etc. What made SHRDLU unique was the combination of four simple ideas that added up to make the simulation of "understanding" far more convincing.

One was that SHRDLU's world was so simple that the entire set of objects and locations could be described by including as few as perhaps 50 words:  nouns like "block" and "cone", verbs like "place on" and "move to", and adjectives like "big" and "blue". The possible combinations of these basic language building blocks were quite simple, and the program was fairly adept at figuring out what the user meant.

SHRDLU also included a basic memory to supply context. One could ask SHRDLU to "put the green cone on the red block" and then "take the cone off"; "the cone" would be taken to mean the green cone one had just talked about. SHRDLU could search back further through the interactions to find the proper context in most cases when additional adjectives were supplied. One could also ask questions about the history, for instance one could ask "did you pick up anything before the cone?"

A side effect of this memory, and the original rules SHRDLU was supplied with, is that the program could answer questions about what was possible in the world and what was not. For instance, SHRDLU would deduce that blocks could be stacked by looking for examples, but would realize that triangles couldn't be stacked, after having tried it. The "world" contained basic physics to make blocks fall over, independent of the language parser.

Finally, SHRDLU could also remember names given to objects, or arrangements of them. For instance one could say "a steeple is a small triangle on top of a tall rectangle"; SHRDLU could then answer questions about steeples in the blocks world, and build new ones.

Here is a famous demonstration of SHRDLU:

Person: Pick up a big red block.
Computer: OK.
Person: Grasp the pyramid.
Computer: I DON'T UNDERSTAND WHICH PYRAMID YOU MEAN.
Person (changing their mind): Find a block which is taller than the one you are holding and put it into the box.
Computer: BY "IT", I ASSUME YOU MEAN THE BLOCK WHICH IS TALLER THAN THE ONE I AM HOLDING.
Computer: OK.
Person: What does the box contain?
Computer: THE BLUE PYRAMID AND THE BLUE BLOCK.
Person: What is the pyramid supported by?
Computer: THE BOX.
Person: How many blocks are not in the box?
Computer: FOUR OF THEM.
Person: Is at least one of them narrower than the one which i told you to pick up?
Computer: YES, THE RED CUBE.
Person: Is it supported?
Computer: YES, BY THE TABLE.
Person: Can the table pick up blocks?
Computer: NO.
Person: Can a pyramid be supported by a block?
Computer: YES.
Person: Can a pyramid support a pyramid?
Computer: I DON'T KNOW.
Person: Stack up two pyramids.
Computer: I CAN'T.
Person: Will you please stack up both of the red blocks and either a green cube or a pyramid?
Computer: OK.
Person: Which cube is sitting on the table?
Computer: THE LARGE GREEN ONE WHICH SUPPORTS THE RED PYRAMID.
Person: Is there a large block behind a pyramid?
Computer: YES, THREE OF THEM: A LARGE RED ONE, A LARGE GREEN CUBE, AND THE BLUE ONE.
Person: Put a small one onto the green cube which supports a pyramid.
Computer: OK.
Person: Put the littlest pyramid on top of it.
Computer: OK.
Person: Does the shortest thing the tallest pyramid's support supports support anything green?
Computer: YES, THE GREEN PYRAMID.
Person: What color is it?
Computer: BY "IT", I ASSUME YOU MEAN THE SHORTEST THING THE TALLEST PYRAMID'S SUPPORT SUPPORTS.
Computer: RED
Person: How many things are on top of green cubes?
Computer: I'M NOT SURE WHAT YOU MEAN BY "ON TOP OF "IN THE PHRASE "ON TOP OF GREEN CUBES " .
DO YOU MEAN:

1 - DIRECTLY ON THE SURFACE
2 - ANWHERE ON TOP OF ?

Person: 2
Computer: THREE OF THEM.
Person: Had you touched any pyramid before you put the green one on the little cube?
Computer: YES, THE GREEN ONE.
Person: When did you pick it up?
Computer: WHILE I WAS STACKING UP THE RED CUBE, A LARGE RED BLOCK AND A LARGE GREEN CUBE.
Person: Why?
Computer: TO GET RID OF IT.
Person: Why did you do that?
Computer: TO CLEAN OFF THE RED CUBE.
Person: Why did you clear off that cube?
Computer: TO PUT IT ON A LARGE GREEN CUBE.
Person: Why did you do that?
Computer: TO STACK UP THE RED CUBE , A LARGE RED BLOCK AND A LARGE GREEN CUBE.
Person: Why did you do that?
Computer: BECAUSE YOU ASKED ME TO.
Person: How did you do it?
Computer: BY PUTTING A LARGE RED BLOCK ON THE TABLE ; THEN LETTING GO OF IT ; THEN PUTTING A LARGE GREEN CUBE ON IT ; THEN LETTING GO OF THAT CUBE ; THEN PUTTING THE RED CUBE ON THAT CUBE; THEN LETTING GO OF THAT CUBE.
Person: How many objects did you touch while you were doing it?
Computer: FOUR OF THEM.
Person: What did the red cube support before you started to clean it off?
Computer: THE GREEN PYRAMID.
Person: There were five blocks to the left of the box then.
Computer: NO, ONLY FOUR OF THEM: THE RED CUBE, TWO LARGE GREEN CUBES AND A LARGE RED BLOCK.
Person: Put the blue pyramid on the block in the box.
Computer: OK.
Person: Is there anything which is bigger than every pyramid but is not as wide as the thing that supports it?
Computer: YES, THE BLUE BLOCK.
Person: Does a steeple
Computer (interrupting): SORRY, I DON'T KNOW THE WORD "STEEPLE".
Person: A "steeple" is a stack which contains two green cubes and a pyramid.
Computer: I UNDERSTAND.
Person: Are there any steeples now?
Computer: NO.
Person: Build one.
Computer: OK.
Person: Call the biggest block "superblock".
Computer: OK.
Person: Have you picked superblock up since we began?
Computer: YES.
Person: Why did you drop it?
Computer: BY "IT", I ASSUME YOU MEAN THE SUPERBLOCK.
I CAN'T EXPLAIN A NON-EXISTENT EVENT.
Person: Is there anything to the right of the red pyramid?
Computer: YES, FOUR THINGS: THE BOX , THE RED CUBE, THE BLUE PYRAMID AND THE BLOCK NAMED SUPERBLOCK
Person: Thank you.
Computer: YOU'RE WELCOME!

Consequences
SHRDLU was considered a tremendously successful demonstration of artificial intelligence (AI). This led other AI researchers to excessive optimism which was soon lost when later systems attempted to deal with situations with a more realistic level of ambiguity and complexity. Subsequent efforts of the SHRDLU type, such as Cyc, have tended to focus on providing the program with considerably more information from which it can draw conclusions.

In a 1991 interview, Winograd said about SHRDLU:

Though not intentionally developed as such, SHRDLU is considered the first known formal example of interactive fiction, as the user interacts with simple commands to move objects around a virtual environment, though lacking the distinct story-telling normally present in the interactive fiction genre. The 1976-1977 game Colossal Cave Adventure is broadly considered to be the first true work of interactive fiction.

See also
 Planner programming language

References

 </ref>

External links
  – Terry Winograd's SHRDLU page, includes source code

  - A re-written versions of SHRDLU, including a Java3D version

History of artificial intelligence
Natural language processing software
Computer-related introductions in 1968